The population exchange between Bulgaria and Romania was a population exchange carried out in 1940 after the transfer of Southern Dobruja to Bulgaria by Romania. It involved 103,711 Romanians, Aromanians and Megleno-Romanians living in Southern Dobruja and 62,278 Bulgarians from Northern Dobruja. After this operation, the application of a population exchange in other cases such as Transylvania was considered.

History
In 1913, the Kingdom of Romania conquered Southern Dobruja after the Bulgarian defeat in the Second Balkan War. The country had already acquired Northern Dobruja in 1878. This sparked revisionalist feelings in Bulgaria. Following the occupation of the Romanian regions of Bessarabia and Northern Bukovina by the Soviet Union in June 1940, Romania sought protection among the Axis powers, but it was demanded to first resolve its territorial disputes with its neighbors. Thus, on 30 August, Romania ceded Northern Transylvania to Hungary in the Second Vienna Award, while at the Treaty of Craiova of 7 September, Romania returned Southern Dobruja to Bulgaria.

Unlike Northern Transylvania, Southern Dobruja was seen as much less important by Romanian nationalists. Those ethnic Romanians who remained in Northern Transylvania were encouraged to remain there, and some nationalists promised to reconquer the region. On the other hand, in Southern Dobruja, the Romanian authorities insisted on carrying out a population exchange with Bulgaria. A total of 103,711 Romanians living in the region were transferred to Romania, while 62,278 Bulgarians native to Northern Dobruja were evacuated to Bulgaria. The Aromanian settlers, most of whom were native to Greece, were counted as Romanians and therefore left the zone as well. The same thing happened to the Megleno-Romanians from the region. These were settled in the village of Cerna, where they replaced the native Bulgarian population. The population exchange was carried out in compliance with the international laws of the time. Romania also proposed to exchange the rest of their respective minorities still residing outside Dobruja in the two countries, but Bulgaria did not approve this.

After the population exchange, in Romania, out of the 21,897 mostly peasant families that arrived, 11,678 were settled in Northern Dobruja, while the rest were settled in groups all over the country where land was available for them.

Aftermath
The population exchange, perceived by some as a success, gave the idea more popularity in Romania. In fact, some people like Sabin Manuilă planned to carry out another one between Hungary and Romania to solve the Transylvanian dispute, but this never happened.

See also
Bulgaria–Romania relations
Aromanians and Romanians in Bulgaria
Bulgarians in Romania
Population exchange between Greece and Turkey

References

History of Dobruja
Bulgarians in Romania
Romanians in Bulgaria
Aromanians in Bulgaria
Megleno-Romanians
Romania in World War II
Bulgaria in World War II
1940 in Bulgaria
1940 in Romania
History of the Aromanians
History of the Megleno-Romanians
Forced migrations in Europe
Ethnic cleansing in Europe
Bulgaria–Romania relations